Moti Bagh, a residential locality in South Delhi, was developed in 1950s to house Government employees. This locality with lot of trees and parks, is divided into South Moti Bagh and North Moti Bagh.

Moti Bagh is official residence to senior civil servants, members and Chairman of the Railway Board, other employees serving in the Government of India and several officers of the Indian Armed Forces.

In 2007, construction for New Moti Bagh was started  which was completed in 2012. Satya Niketan is located to the south-west of Moti Bagh, and Shanti Niketan and Anand Niketan, two of the rich localities of Delhi are located to the south of Moti Bagh.

History
Situated on the south of Chanakyapuri, the colony has derived its name from a bagh (garden) and the area's name which was Arakpur Bagh Mochi.
Maulavi Zafar Hasan's Monuments of Delhi published in 1919 describes Moti Bagh as: "The Bagh is an extensive enclosures surrounded by a masonry wall with a bastion at each of the four corners and a big gateway towards east. in the centre of the enclosure there is a tank about 120 sq. feet with a circular bastion, which has a pavilion of three compartments on its northern bank. it was originally a bagh built by one Ramdas entitled Mochi and it is after his title that the garden is known". at the turn of the century the area came to be known as Mochi Bagh rather than the Arakpur Bagh Mochi. 

The name ‘Mochi Bagh’ remained on paper. After India’s independence, the process of land acquisition to build accommodations for the employees of the Central Government began.  Once completed, the name Mochi Bagh sounded a tad too crass for a high-end government accommodation, so the babudom quietly changed it to 'Moti Bagh'," says RV Smith, a prominent historian. "Till early 1950s, it was all agricultural land and a few houses. The people who were well off left the area to buy kothis elsewhere," said Ashok Tanwer, resident of Fatehpur Beri. Ironically, what remains of Arakpur Bagh Mochi is an unauthorised cluster awaiting regularisation.

Overview
It is easily accessible from Health centers like AIIMS and Indira Gandhi International Airport, one of India's biggest and busiest airports. Nanak Pura Gurudwara is also located very near to Moti Bagh. The nearest working metro station is the Dhaula Kuan metro station. The moti bagh metro station is under construction located on the pink line of the delhi metro.

The north west moti bagh colony has two main markets, Begum Zaidi Market and Basrurkar Market. There is one hospital and a CGHS dispensary, both near Begum Zaidi Market. There are 8 schools, 5 of them are on North Moti bagh; a primary co-ed school, two Sarvodaya Vidyalays; boys and girls school, and 2 run by  NDMC (New Delhi Municipal Corporation); NP Co-ed senior secondary school and Navyug School while 3 of them are on South Moti bagh; sarvodaya vidyalays separate for boys and girls, and Delhi Tamil Education Association (DTEA) Sr. Secondary School. The National Rail Museum, New Delhi is also located nearby. The historic 'Gurudwara Moti Bagh Sahib' was built in 1783 by Sikh military general Baghel Singh, along with other noted gurudwaras like Gurdwara Rakab Ganj Sahib and Bangla Sahib.

North West Moti Bagh has high rise and multi-storey apartments.

Moti Bagh has Type 2, Type 3, Type 4, D-II (B and C blocks) and C-II and C-I houses.

Education
A District Institute of Education and Training (DIET) of SCERT for South Delhi zone is also situated here. Apart from South Study Centre of School of Open Learning at South Moti Bagh, New Delhi. Delhi University's colleges like Sri Venkateswara College, Atma Ram sanatan college and Ram lal Anand college are situated near by.

Notable residents
 Raghuram Rajan
 Mukund Rajan

References 

New Delhi district
Cities and towns in New Delhi district
New Delhi
Neighbourhoods in Delhi
South Delhi district
1970s establishments in Delhi